June Bland (born 2 June 1931) is a British actress.

Bland played a leading role in the 1960s British soap, The Newcomers.  She also appeared in two Doctor Who serials - Earthshock (1982) and Battlefield (1989). She has now become a Principal of her local Stage-Coach performing arts school.

External links
 

1931 births
Living people
British television actresses